Nicolas "Nico" Berg (born September 11, 1973) is a retired Canadian soccer midfielder.

Player

Club
Played youth soccer with the Lynn Valley Falcons and was a member of the UBC Thunderbirds men's varsity soccer team. Berg played in the Canadian Soccer League in 1992 with the London Lasers. In 1993, he played in the Canadian National Soccer League with Winnipeg Fury. In 1994, Berg joined the Vancouver 86ers in the American Professional Soccer League. Berg did not play in 2000, but returned to the team in 2001. That season, the 86ers were renamed the Whitecamps.  Berg retired after the 2002 season.  In 2004, he played for the amateur Surrey Pegasus FC when it won the 2004 Canadian National Challenge Cup.

International
Berg played one game at the 1989 FIFA U-16 World Championship.  He went on to appear for Canada at the U-20 and U-23 levels.

Physiotherapist
In 1997, Berg earned a bachelor's degree in physical therapy from the University of British Columbia.  He later gained a masters in physiotherapy from the University of Queensland.  He works as a sports physiotherapist.

Career stats

References

External links
 
 

1973 births
Living people
Sportspeople from North Vancouver
Soccer people from British Columbia
American Professional Soccer League players
Canadian soccer players
London Lasers players
Winnipeg Fury players
Vancouver Whitecaps (1986–2010) players
UBC Thunderbirds soccer players
University of British Columbia Faculty of Medicine alumni
Canadian Soccer League (1987–1992) players
Canadian National Soccer League players
A-League (1995–2004) players
Canada men's youth international soccer players
Canada men's under-23 international soccer players
Association football midfielders
Association football physiotherapists